Vittorio Pusceddu (born 12 February 1964) is a retired Italian football defender.

Honours
Fiorentina
Supercoppa Italiana: 1996

References

1964 births
Living people
Italian footballers
Cagliari Calcio players
Torino F.C. players
Ascoli Calcio 1898 F.C. players
Udinese Calcio players
Genoa C.F.C. players
Hellas Verona F.C. players
S.S.C. Napoli players
ACF Fiorentina players
Empoli F.C. players
Association football defenders
Serie A players
Serie B players
People from the Province of South Sardinia
Footballers from Sardinia